Yengi Qaleh-ye Bala (also Romanized as Yengī Qal‘eh-ye Bālā and Yangī Qal‘eh-ye Bālā; also known as Yengī Qal‘eh-ye ‘Olyā, Yangī Qal‘eh, and Yengī Qaleh) is a village in Qushkhaneh-ye Bala Rural District, Qushkhaneh District, Shirvan County, North Khorasan Province, Iran. At the 2006 census, its population was 862, in 218 families.

References 

Populated places in Shirvan County